Barnesville is an unincorporated community in Robeson County, North Carolina, United States. Barnesville had a post office from May 15, 1879, to September 11, 2010; it still has its own ZIP code, 28319.

The community was founded in 1888 and named after Richard Rhodes Barnes who provided land for a railway through the community.

References

Unincorporated communities in Robeson County, North Carolina
Unincorporated communities in North Carolina